In Christianity, the Great Commission is the instruction of the resurrected Jesus Christ to his disciples to spread the gospel to all the nations of the world. The Great Commission is outlined in Matthew 28:16–20, where on a mountain in Galilee Jesus calls on his followers to make disciples of and baptize all nations in the name of the Father, the Son, and the Holy Spirit.

The Great Commission is similar to the episodes of the commissioning of the Twelve Apostles found in the other Synoptic Gospels, though with significant differences. Luke also has Jesus during his ministry dispatching disciples, including the seventy disciples, sending them to all the nations and giving them power over demons. The dispersion of the Apostles in the traditional ending of Mark is thought to be a 2nd-century summary based on Matthew and Luke.

It has become a tenet in Christian theology emphasizing ministry, missionary work, evangelism, and baptism. The apostles are said to have dispersed from Jerusalem and founded the apostolic sees , such as those at Corinth, Philippi, Ephesus, and Rome (see also: Holy See). Preterists believe that the Great Commission and other Bible prophecies were fulfilled in the 1st century while futurists believe Bible prophecy is yet to be fulfilled at the Second Coming.

History
It is not known who coined the term Great Commission, though it may have been Justinian von Welz
and it was later popularized by Hudson Taylor.

New Testament accounts

Interpretations
The commission from Jesus has been interpreted by evangelical Christians as meaning that his followers have the duty to go, make disciples, teach, and baptize.

Full Preterists believe that the Great Commission was already fulfilled based on the New Testament passages "And they went out and preached everywhere", "the gospel that you have heard, which was proclaimed in all creation under heaven", and "Now to Him who is able to establish you according to my gospel and the preaching of Jesus Christ, according to the revelation of the mystery which has been kept secret for long ages past, but now is manifested, and by the scriptures of the prophets, according to the commandment of the eternal God, has been made known to all the nations".

See also

 Ad gentes
 Evangelii gaudium
 Evangelii nuntiandi
 Evangelism
 Matthew 28:16, 17, 18, 19, 20
 New evangelization
 Overview of resurrection appearances in the Gospels and Paul
 Redemptoris Missio

References 

1st-century Christianity
Christian missions
Christian terminology
Doctrines and teachings of Jesus
Matthew 28
Holy Spirit
Galilee
Post-resurrection appearances of Jesus